Sanjay Van is a sprawling city forest area near Vasant Kunj and Mehrauli in Delhi, India. It is spread over an area of 443 acres. It is one of the most thickly wooded areas of the city’s green lungs.

Concerns
The forest, which is part of the Mehrauli South Central Ridge, has undergone severe degradation in recent times with the proliferation of the Prosopis juliflora tree which is non-endemic to the Aravalli Ranges and has caused depletion of the ground water level, killing native flora and changing the natural soil characteristics of the Aravallis. Sewage water and effluent which is discharged into Sanjay Van has also affected this green belt in the Capital.

Restoration Work
Amid a growing demand from nature lovers, the forest is going to be made a bird sanctuary. The Sanjay Van, which is presently undergoing restoration through a unique collaborative effort between the Delhi Development Authority and a citizen's group, may well serve as a model that will be replicated to restore other ridges in the capital.

Attractions

Apart from heritage, the area is one of the few recluses for bird watchers and nature enthusiasts. Resident or visiting birds include the Indian peafowl, grey heron, Eurasian golden oriole, purple sunbird, Asian koel, Brahminy starling, Indian silverbill, grey-breasted prinia, crested honey buzzard, white-throated kingfisher, rufous treepie, Indian paradise flycatcher, Eurasian sparrowhawk, red-wattled lapwing, cattle egret, common moorhen, white-breasted waterhen, grey francolin and the Jacobin cuckoo, a migrant from Africa that breeds in this forest.

The forest also conserves natural habitat for the nilgai, golden jackal, snakes and a large variety of butterflies.

Terrain
As the land is a part of Aravalli Range it shows all the characteristics of the same. Some areas have flat lands some have uphills and downhills. The whole area is full of big giant rocks forming a small hill every here and there. It has got some small drains spreading all over the areas which can be seen in every 300-400 meters of a walk. Overall we can say it has got a terrain of forest and hills.

Visit
There are multiple entry and exit points, but the ones at the Qutub Institutional Area and Neela Hauz Bridge near Vasant Kunj provide the easiest access and least confusion. Visitors are advised to wear shoes and full-length trousers as protection against the thorny shrubbery, and to take sufficient fluids and snacks, as there is no kiosk or shop in the quiet of the woods.

See also
 Najafgarh drain bird sanctuary
 Okhla Sanctuary
 Asola Bhatti Wildlife Sanctuary
 Sultanpur National Park
 Neela Hauz biodiversity park

References 
 Into the Woods | Bird Watching at Sanjay Van, So Delhi, 5 May 2016
 Sanjay Van a bird sanctuary in the making, staff reporter, The Hindu, 20 October 2011

Parks in Delhi
Urban forests